The 2005 FIBA Stanković Continental Champions' Cup, or 2005 FIBA Stanković World Cup, was the first edition of the FIBA Stanković Continental Champions' Cup tournament. It was held in Beijing, from July 26 to July 31.

Participating teams

 Angola (FIBA Africa Champions)
 Argentina (2004 Olympic Champions)
 Australia (FIBA Oceania Champions)
 China (FIBA Asia Champions)
 Lithuania (FIBA Europe Champions)
 Puerto Rico (FIBA Americas Championship runner-up)

Teams played a round-robin tournament.

Results

|}

Day 1

26 Jul –  Argentina  -  Australia 88:57

26 Jul –  China -  Angola 62:61

26 Jul –  Lithuania -  Puerto Rico 82:73

27 Jul –  Argentina -  Angola 83:64

27 Jul –  Australia -  Puerto Rico 106:78

27 Jul –  Lithuania -  China 68:66

29 Jul –  Angola -  Australia 62:49

29 Jul –  China -  Puerto Rico 91:80

29 Jul –  Lithuania -  Argentina 83:77

30 Jul –  Angola -  Puerto Rico 90:73

30 Jul –  Argentina -  China 86:66

30 Jul –  Australia -  Lithuania 109:96

31 Jul –  Argentina -  Puerto Rico 86:79

31 Jul –  Australia -  China 71:58

31 Jul –  Lithuania -  Angola 77:73

Final standings

Individual awards

All-Tournament Team
 C. J. Bruton ( Australia)
 Rick Apodaca ( Puerto Rico)
 Zhu Fangyu ( China)
 Martynas Andriukaitis ( Lithuania)
 Gabriel Fernández ( Argentina)

Top Scorer
 Rick Apodaca ( Puerto Rico)

MVP
 Martynas Andriukaitis ( Lithuania)

External links
Official Website

2005
2005–06 in Chinese basketball
2005–06 in Angolan basketball
2005–06 in Australian basketball
2005–06 in Argentine basketball
2005–06 in Lithuanian basketball
2005 in Puerto Rican sports